Martina Pavić (born 27 October 1988) is a Croatian handballer who plays for Kastamonu Bld. GSK and the Croatian women's national team.

International honours 
EHF Cup Winners' Cup:
Quarterfinals: 2012

References

1988 births
Living people
Handball players from Zagreb
Croatian female handball players
Croatian expatriate sportspeople in Serbia
Croatian expatriate sportspeople in Turkey
Expatriate handball players in Turkey
Muratpaşa Bld. SK (women's handball) players
Kastamonu Bld. SK (women's handball) players
Mediterranean Games competitors for Croatia
Competitors at the 2009 Mediterranean Games